Barbara Buchan (born 1956) is an American cyclist who won two gold medals at the 2008 Summer Paralympics in Beijing, China.

Buchan originally was a track and field competitor. She was also considered a top U.S. cyclist until a road race accident in 1982 shattered her skull, placing her into a coma for two months and causing permanent brain injuries. Following surgeries and rehabilitation, she returned to the track at the 1988 Summer Paralympics in Seoul, winning a silver in the 800m. Buchan cycled against men at the 2000 Paralympics in Sydney, finishing two races at 9th and 10th. She competed at the 2004 games in Athens when women's cycling was first included in the Paralympics.

Personal life
Buchan was raised in Mountain Home, Idaho. In 1974 she graduated from Mountain Home High School and in 1978 she earned a bachelor's degree in athletic training/teaching from Boise State University.

References

External links
 
 

American female cyclists
Cyclists at the 2008 Summer Paralympics
Paralympic cyclists of the United States
Paralympic gold medalists for the United States
Boise State University alumni
Living people
1950s births
Medalists at the 1988 Summer Paralympics
Medalists at the 2008 Summer Paralympics
Paralympic silver medalists for the United States
People from Mountain Home, Idaho
Paralympic medalists in cycling
Paralympic medalists in athletics (track and field)
21st-century American women
20th-century American women